The 2005 Washington State Cougars football team represented Washington State University in the Pacific-10 Conference during the 2005 NCAA Division I-A football season. Led by third-year head coach Bill Doba, WSU played its home games at on campus Martin Stadium in Pullman, with one at Qwest Field in Seattle.

Season
Washington State was picked fifth in the pre-season Pac-10 conference poll. They were even classified by some as a sleeper pick for the national championship, with Alex Brink at the helm. They opened with three non-conference wins in September, but the results were different in league play. In the Pac-10 opener at Oregon State, Brink passed for over 500 yards, but WSU lost by eleven.

The Cougars lost their next three games (Stanford, UCLA, Cal), by a combined ten points; their inability to close out games cost them. After a blowout loss in Los Angeles to top-ranked USC, three-point setbacks at home to Arizona State and #11 Oregon followed, as the conference losing streak extended to seven games. In the Apple Cup at Seattle, they defeated struggling rival Washington by four points to finish at 4–7 overall.

Schedule

Game summaries

Washington

References

Washington State
Washington State Cougars football seasons
Washington State Cougars football